The non-marine molluscs of Uruguay are a part of the molluscan fauna of Uruguay (wildlife of Uruguay).

A number of species of non-marine molluscs are found in the wild in Uruguay.

Freshwater gastropods 
Freshwater gastropods in the Uruguay include:

Ampullariidae - 10 species
 Asolene platae (Maton, 1809)
 Asolene pulchella (Anton, 1839)
 Asolene spixii (d’Orbigny, 1837)
 Felipponea elongata (Dall, 1921)
 Felipponea iheringi (Pilsbry, 1933)
 Felipponea neritiniformis (Dall, 1919)
 Pomella megastoma (G. B. Sowerby I, 1825)
 Pomacea canaliculata (Lamarck, 1822)
 Pomacea insularum (d’Orbigny, 1835)
 Pomacea scalaris (d’Orbigny, 1835)

Cochliopidae - 6 species
 Heleobia adamsi (Preston, 1912)
 Heleobia guaranitica (Doering, 1884)
 Heleobia parchappii (d’Orbigny, 1835)
 Heleobia piscium (d’Orbigny, 1835)
 Heleobia scottii (Pilsbry, 1911)
 Heleobia uruguayana (Pilsbry, 1924)

Lithoglyphidae - 17 species
 Potamolithus agapetus Pilsbry, 1911
 Potamolithus bushii (Frauenfeld, 1865)
 Potamolithus carinifer Pilsbry, 1911
 Potamolithus catharinae Pilsbry, 1911
 Potamolithus doeringi Pilsbry, 1911
 Potamolithus felipponei Ihering, 1910
 Potamolithus hidalgoi Pilsbry, 1896
 Potamolithus iheringi Pilsbry, 1896
 Potamolithus lapidum (d'Orbigny, 1835)
 Potamolithus orbignyi Pilsbry, 1896
 Potamolithus peristomatus (d'Orbigny, 1835)
 Potamolithus petitianus (d'Orbigny, 1840) - subspecies Potamolithus petitianus sykesii Pilsbry, 1896
 Potamolithus philipianus Pilsbry, 1911
 Potamolithus quadratus Pilsbry & Ihering, 1911
 Potamolithus rushii Pilsbry, 1896
 Potamolithus simplex Pilsbry, 1911
 Potamolithus tricostatus (Brot, 1867)

Lymnaeidae - 2 species
 Lymnaea viator (d’Orbigny, 1835)
 Pseudosuccinea columella (Say, 1817)

Physidae - 1 species
 "Aplexa" minor (d’Orbigny, 1837)

Planorbidae - 13 species
 Biomphalaria tenagophila (d’Orbigny, 1835) - Biomphalaria tenagophila tenagophila (d’Orbigny, 1835) and Biomphalaria tenagophila guaibensis Paraense, 1984
 Biomphalaria peregrina (d’Orbigny, 1835)
 Biomphalaria straminea (Dunker, 1848)
 Drepanotrema anatinum (d’Orbigny, 1835)
 Drepanotrema cimex (Moricand, 1839)
 Drepanotrema depressissimum (Moricand, 1839)
 Drepanotrema heloicum (d’Orbigny, 1835)
 Drepanotrema kermatoides (d’Orbigny, 1835)
 Drepanotrema lucidum (Pfeiffer, 1839)
 Antillorbis nordestensis (Lucena, 1954)
 Uncancylus concentricus (d’Orbigny, 1835)
 Hebetancylus moricandi (d’Orbigny, 1837)
 Anisancylus obliquus (Broderip & G. B. Sowerby I, 1832)

Chilinidae - 2 species
 Chilina fluminea (Maton, 1809)
 Chilina rushii Pilsbry, 1896

Land gastropods 

Charopidae
 Radiodiscus iheringi
 Trochogyra leptotera Rochebrune & Mabille, 1882

Freshwater bivalves

See also
 List of marine molluscs of Uruguay
 Fauna of Uruguay
Lists of molluscs of surrounding countries:
 List of non-marine molluscs of Argentina, Wildlife of Argentina
 List of non-marine molluscs of Brazil, Wildlife of Brazil

References

Nonmarine molluscs
Molluscs
Uruguay
Uruguay
Uruguay
Uruguay